This is a list of named Holidays in Bermuda.  Every Sunday is also considered a holiday.

Nature of Public Holidays

The official list of Public Holidays was set out in 1947 in the Public Holidays Act.  Since then, the only change to the actual list has been the change of name of Cup Match Day to Emancipation Day at the end of 1999.

Public holidays featured nearly a complete shut-down of Bermuda, with all public offices and stores closed.  Not only was the sale of goods on public holidays made illegal, but offering items for sale and even allowing customers into a store constituted an offense.  Hotel restaurants, pharmacies and stores that had been granted special licenses by the government were exempted from this.

In March 2005, the Bermuda government passed a major amendment to the Act that allowed stores to finally open.  It required that employers give their staff at least seven days (written) notice of a need for their service; it also required that employers inform those employees of their right to refuse, and prohibited any sort of disciplinary action or dismissal for employees who did refuse.

References

External links
 Bermuda Online

Bermudian culture
Bermuda
Bermuda